The Canadian Baseball Hall of Fame and Museum is a museum located in St. Marys, Ontario, Canada.  The museum commemorates great players, teams, and accomplishments  of baseball in Canada.

History

The museum was founded in November 1982 in Toronto at Exhibition Place and later moved to Ontario Place theme park. In August 1994, it was awarded to St. Marys, Ontario, and in June 1998 the doors officially opened in St. Marys. On November 23, 2017, construction began on a  expansion to the museum, including a secure archive facility, library, new entrance, and auditorium/exhibition space. The re-designed museum opened to the public on April 27, 2019.

The Hall of Fame and Museum is dedicated to preserving Canada's baseball heritage which dates back to June 4, 1838, when a game which very closely resembled today's game of baseball was played in Beachville, Ontario.

In 2021, Helen Callaghan, who had played in the All-American Girls Professional Baseball League (AAGPBL), became the first woman individually inducted to the Canadian Baseball Hall of Fame; the Hall had previously inducted, as a group in 1998, all Canadian women who played in the AAGPBL.

In early 2022, the Hall of Fame was criticized for not inducting the Chatham Coloured All-Stars, the first Black team to win an Ontario Baseball Association title.

Awards
Since opening, over 125 individual members have been inducted into the hall. This includes professional and amateur players, builders, administrators, umpires, broadcasters, writers, and honorary members who have helped popularize the sport in Canada. Several teams or groups have also been inducted. Multiple members of the hall have also been inducted into the National Baseball Hall of Fame and Museum in Cooperstown, New York, as players, managers, or executives; several others have been recipients of the Ford C. Frick Award or BBWAA Career Excellence Award.

In addition, the Canadian Baseball Hall of Fame awards the Tip O'Neill Award annually to the Canadian baseball player "judged to have excelled in individual achievement and team contribution while adhering to the highest ideals of the game of baseball" and the Jack Graney Award for Lifetime Media Achievement.

Facilities
The  facility in St. Marys also includes four baseball fields designed by landscape architect Art Lierman of London, Ontario.

The Pearson Cup—awarded to the winner of an annual exhibition game between the Toronto Blue Jays and Montreal Expos from 1978 to 1986—is on display at the museum.

Rules for nominations
 A player must be retired for at least three years.
 Must receive 75 percent of the vote to be inducted.
 If the person is not Canadian he must have done something significant with respect to baseball in Canada.
 The person nominated will stay on the ballot for nine years as long as he receives a minimum of one vote every two years.
 All information must be in by December 1 of the year to be eligible for the following year.

Inductees

Individuals

Groups

See also

History of baseball outside the United States#Canada
London Tecumsehs#Early baseball in Canada
:Category:Baseball in Canada
Baseball awards#Canada

References

External links
Official website

Hall of Fame
Baseball museums and halls of fame
Halls of fame in Canada
Museums in Perth County, Ontario
Sports museums in Canada
Canadian sports trophies and awards
Awards established in 1983
Museums established in 1983
1983 establishments in Ontario